Theresa Breslin  is a Scottish author. Winner of many literary awards, including the prestigious Carnegie Medal, Theresa Breslin is the popular, critically acclaimed author of over 50 titles covering every age range, whose books have been adapted for television, stage and radio, and are translated world-wide. Her work includes folk tales, humorous books, fantasy and time slip adventures, historical novels, modern issues, texts suitable for challenged and EAL readers, short stories, poetry and plays. She is an Honorary Fellow of the Association for Scottish Literary Studies. In March 2019 Theresa was awarded Scottish Book Trust's Outstanding Achievement Award. 
In June 2019 Theresa received an O.B.E. in the Queen's Birthday Honours List for services to Literature.

Career 
Breslin grew up in Kirkintilloch, Scotland.  She started writing as a teenager; writing about the closing of a nearby steel mill.  She began writing for publication whilst employed as a librarian, and has published over 50 books.

Whispers in the Graveyard, published by Methuen in 1994, features a dyslexic boy. Breslin won the annual Carnegie Medal from the Library Association, recognising it as the year's best children's book by a British subject. Divided City (2005) is her 8th book for the Doubleday list. The Medici Seal, (August 2006) for which her research was extensive, with trips to study Leonardo da Vinci’s most famous works, including the Mona Lisa and The Last Supper. Matteo carries with him a secret – a secret that both the Borgia and the Medici families would kill to obtain.

Breslin was appointed Officer of the Order of the British Empire (OBE) in the 2019 Birthday Honours for services to literature.

Works

Simon's Challenge (1988)
Different Directions (1989)
Time to Reap (1991)
Kezzie (1993)
Bullies at School (1993)
Whispers in the Graveyard (1994)
Alien Force (1995)
A Homecoming for Kezzie (1995)
Missing (1995) 
Death or Glory Boys (1996)
Name Games (1997)
Across the Roman Wall (1997)
Blair, the Winner! (1997) – four stories
Name Games (1997)
Bodyparts (1998)
Starship Rescue (1999)
Blair Makes a Splash (1999) – four stories
The Dream Master (1999) 
Dream Master – Nightmare! (2000)
Duncan of Carrick (2000)
Remembrance (2002) 
New School Blues (2002)
Dream Master – Gladiator' (2003)Prisoner in Alcatraz (2004)Dream Master – Arabian Nights (2004)Saskia's Journey (2004)Divided City (2005)The Medici Seal (2006)The Nostradamus Prophecy (2008)Prisoner of the Inquisition (2010)Spy for the Queen of Scots (2012)

Awards and honours
 Winner of the Carnegie Medal for Children's Literature - for Whispers in the Graveyard Awarded Honorary Membership of the Scottish Library Association for distinguished services to Children's Literature and Librarianship, 2000
 Scottish Writers CD ROM (Project Manager) – Bafta nomination 
 Selected for the American Library Association's Best Books for Young Adults, and New York Public Library's Books for the Teen Age 2003.
 Civic Award from Strathkelvin
 Winner of the Scottish Book Trust Best of the Decade Award 
 Winner of Young Book Trust's Kathleen Fidler Award for Simon's Challenge''
 Winner of the Sheffield Children's Book Award - longer novel
 Awarded Honorary Fellowship of the Association for Scottish Literary Studies, 2010
 OBE for Services to Literature, 2019

Runners up, etc.
The Children's Book Award (twice)
The Angus Book Award
The Lancashire Book Award
The Moray Book Award
North-East Book Award
The Sheffield Book Award (twice)
South Lanark Book Award
The Stockton Book Award

See also

References

External links
 
 

Scottish children's writers
Scottish librarians
British women librarians
Carnegie Medal in Literature winners
Year of birth missing (living people)
Place of birth missing (living people)
Living people
Officers of the Order of the British Empire